Ryan Watson (born June 12, 1981) is a Canadian-born Italian former professional ice hockey player. He played the prime of his career in Italy's Serie A.

Playing career
Watson began his career in 1998 playing for his local team, the Lethbridge Hurricanes at junior level in the WHL. Watson did not start particularly well though, and managed just one point in 22 games in his first season.

For the 2000–01 season, Watson would play at the lower junior level of the AJHL for the Drayton Valley Thunder. His performances were much improved, and a ratio of over a point per game was established during a season in which Watson played almost 60 times totalling over 100 points.

Watson would begin his professional career with the Oklahoma City Blazers of the CHL. He would settle well and established himself as an important first team player, turning out in 118 games in the two seasons, and totalling 74 points in that time. His performances brought him to the attention of the Victoria Salmon Kings. The Salmon Kings signed Watson for the 2004–05 season. Watson managed 33 games and 29 points.

Despite his positive points return, he did not re-signed with the Salmon Kings and so returned to the CHL with the then named Memphis Riverkings. Watson again proved his quality, totalling 59 points in 64 games. In the summer of 2006, Watson moved to Europe and was signed by the Manchester Phoenix of the EIHL, the highest tier of club hockey in Britain. Watson played in only 10 games for the Phoenix before returning to North America though.

On his return he would re-sign for one of his old teams, the Oklahoma City Blazers. Watson continued to score points regularly for the Blazers throughout both the regular and post-season periods, managing a point per game ratio. This productivity meant that the Blazers re-signed Watson for the 2007–08 season. It would again be a positive season for Watson, who would go on to score 55 points in 63 games.

He would return to Europe and Italy to sign for Cortina SG of the Serie A. Despite the language barrier, Watson settled well and begun once again to clock up regular goals and assists. Watson began to play for the Italian nation team and became a pivotal player in there success to winning a world championship. After four seasons in Italy, Watson announced his retirement from professional hockey at the conclusion of the 2011–12 season. Finishing with a spectacular career winning three world championships, multiple team championships and individual awards. After retirement was inducted into the lethbridge sports hall of fame in 2013

Career statistics

References

External links
 

1981 births
Living people
HC Pustertal Wölfe players
Ice hockey people from Alberta
Italian ice hockey forwards
Lethbridge Hurricanes players
Manchester Phoenix players
Memphis RiverKings players
Oklahoma City Blazers (1992–2009) players
Ritten Sport players
SG Cortina players
Sportspeople from Lethbridge
Victoria Salmon Kings players